Grice House may refer to:

Grice House Museum, Harbor Beach, Michigan, listed on the National Register as James and Jane Grice House
Milford (Camden, North Carolina), also known as Relfe-Grice-Sawyer House
Grice-Fearing House, Elizabeth City, North Carolina

See also
Grice Inn, Wrightsville, Georgia, listed on the National Register of Historic Places in Johnson County, Georgia
Grice (disambiguation)